Cmiljka Kalušević, (Serbian Cyrillic: Цмиљка Калушевић; April 9, 1933 in Tarragona, Spain - 1989 in Belgrade, SFR Yugoslavia) is a former Yugoslav and Serbian female basketball player and athlete.

External links
Profile at fibaeurope.com

1933 births
1989 deaths
Sportspeople from Tarragona
Yugoslav women's basketball players
Serbian women's basketball players
Centers (basketball)
ŽKK Crvena zvezda players
People from Ivanjica